Taco Time (stylized as TacoTime) is an American fast-food restaurant chain specializing in Mexican-American food. The chain has over 226 locations in the United States and 74 locations in Western Canada. It was founded in Eugene, Oregon, in 1960 by Ron Fraedrick.

History
The chain was founded in Eugene by Ron Fraedrick (1928–2015), who opened the first restaurant near his alma mater, the University of Oregon, at 13th Avenue and High Street in January 1960.

In 1962, the first Taco Time franchise opened in White Center, Washington.  In the 1970s, the company expanded to 48 restaurants in seven Western states. In 1978, the company franchised its first international restaurant in Lethbridge, Alberta, Canada.

In 1979, Taco Time Northwest became a licensee with the rights to franchise and operate the Taco Time concept independently.  Taco Time Northwest's operating region includes western Washington from Longview to the Canada–United States border and the eastern Washington cities of Wenatchee and Moses Lake.

In 1984, a location in The Dalles was poisoned by members of the Rajneesh movement in a bioterror attack.

Taco Time has since expanded, now holding more than 300 franchises in the United States, Canada, Kuwait, and Netherlands Antilles (Curaçao). During the 1990s, there were also multiple locations in Greece.

In 2003, the company was bought by Kahala Brands of Scottsdale, Arizona.

References

External links
 
 

Kahala Brands
Companies based in Eugene, Oregon
Companies based in Scottsdale, Arizona
Privately held companies based in Oregon
Restaurants in Oregon
Economy of the Western United States
Regional restaurant chains in the United States
Fast-food chains of the United States
Fast-food chains of Canada
Restaurants established in 1960
Fast-food Mexican restaurants
Multinational companies
1960 establishments in Oregon
2003 mergers and acquisitions
Restaurants in Eugene, Oregon